Luis Alberto Romero Alconchel (born 28 September 1992), known as Luis Alberto, is a Spanish professional footballer who plays as an attacking midfielder or winger for Serie A club Lazio.

After coming through Sevilla's youth system, he signed with Liverpool in 2013 from Barcelona B, being loaned to Málaga and Deportivo during his contract. In August 2016 he joined Lazio for €4 million, going on to spend several seasons in Serie A with the club.

Luis Alberto made his senior debut for Spain in 2017.

Club career

Sevilla
A product of Sevilla FC, Luis Alberto was born in San José del Valle, Province of Cádiz, and he spent his first two seasons as a senior with the reserves in Segunda División B, scoring 15 goals in his second. On 16 April 2011 he made his first-team – and La Liga – debut for the Andalusians, replacing another club youth graduate, Rodri, in the second half of a 1–0 away loss against Getafe CF.

Barcelona B

In August 2012, Luis Alberto was loaned to FC Barcelona Atlètic in a one-year deal, with the Catalans having the option to make the move permanent at the end of the season. He made his official debut on 2 September by playing two minutes in a 2–0 home win over CE Sabadell FC, and finished the campaign as second top scorer in the squad, only behind Gerard Deulofeu.

Liverpool
On 20 June 2013, Sevilla received a £6.8 million offer from Liverpool for Luis Alberto, which was accepted. The signing was completed two days later subject to international clearance, and he made his debut for the English club on 13 July in a 4–0 pre-season friendly win against Preston North End.

Luis Alberto made his Premier League debut on 1 September 2013, playing the last seven minutes in a 1–0 home victory over Manchester United in place of Philippe Coutinho. On 15 December, shortly after having scored a hat-trick in an under-21 match with the Reds, he provided an assist for Luis Suárez in the 5–0 away demolition of Tottenham Hotspur.

On 26 June 2014, Luis Alberto was loaned to Málaga CF in a season-long move. In the league opener, on 23 August, he scored the only goal in a home defeat of Athletic Bilbao.

On 5 July 2015, Luis Alberto agreed a loan move to Deportivo de La Coruña subject to a medical the following day. There, he linked up with manager Víctor Sánchez, who was previously in Sevilla's coaching staff.

Lazio
On 31 August 2016, Luis Alberto signed for Italian club S.S. Lazio for a fee of €4 million. He played only nine Serie A matches in his first season, but became an undisputed starter for the Simone Inzaghi-led side from there onwards.

Luis Alberto scored 12 goals in all competitions in the 2017–18 campaign, and added 18 assists. In October 2020, he tested positive for COVID-19.

International career
Luis Alberto earned his only cap for the Spain under-21 team on 5 February 2013, coming on for Valencia CF's Paco Alcácer midway through the second half of a 1–1 friendly draw in Belgium. He first appeared with the full side on 11 November 2017, playing the last 16 minutes in a 5–0 friendly win against Costa Rica.

Style of play
A talented and versatile playmaker, Luis Alberto usually plays either in a central role as an attacking midfielder or as a left winger, a position which allows him to cut inside and shoot on goal with his stronger right foot. He is also capable of playing in several other attacking positions including second striker, or even in a deeper role as an offensive minded central midfielder, known as the mezzala in Italian football jargon. Although he lacks physicality, he is known for his awareness, technical qualities, ball control and dribbling skills, as well as his passing, crossing and vision, which allow him to create chances and provide assists for teammates. 

Moreover, he is an accurate set piece taker who possesses an eye for goal, and has a penchant for shooting from distance. Beyond his offensive qualities, he is also known for his defensive work-rate.

Personal life
On 19 January 2021, Luis Alberto underwent a successful emergency surgery in Rome to treat appendicitis.

He married his longtime girlfriend Patricia Venegas, fathering daughter Martina (born 2016) and son Lucas (2018).

Career statistics

Club

International

Honours
Lazio
Coppa Italia: 2018–19
Supercoppa Italiana: 2017, 2019

Individual
Serie A Team of the Year: 2019–20
Serie A Player of the Month: February 2020

Notes

References

External links

1992 births
Living people
Sportspeople from the Province of Cádiz
Spanish footballers
Footballers from Andalusia
Association football midfielders
Association football wingers
La Liga players
Segunda División players
Segunda División B players
Tercera División players
Sevilla FC C players
Sevilla Atlético players
Sevilla FC players
FC Barcelona Atlètic players
Málaga CF players
Deportivo de La Coruña players
Premier League players
Liverpool F.C. players
Serie A players
S.S. Lazio players
Spain youth international footballers
Spain under-21 international footballers
Spain international footballers
Spanish expatriate footballers
Expatriate footballers in England
Expatriate footballers in Italy
Spanish expatriate sportspeople in England
Spanish expatriate sportspeople in Italy